Wendy Moe is the associate dean and a marketing professor at the Robert H. Smith School of Business at the University of Maryland.  In 2013, she launched and the directed the Smith School's MS in Marketing Analytics program. She is known for her research in digital and social media analytics.

Moe frequently speaks to business communities, such as the Marketing Science Institute, on issues related to social media marketing and analytics. Moe's research on binge watching behavior in a streaming environment has been featured on  the NPR show, The Hidden Brain hosted by Shankar Vedantam.

Education 
Moe earned a BS, MA and PhD from the Wharton School at the University of Pennsylvania and an MBA from Georgetown University.

Books 
 Social Media Intelligence, Cambridge University Press 2014,

References 

Year of birth missing (living people)
Living people
University of Maryland, College Park faculty
Wharton School of the University of Pennsylvania alumni
McDonough School of Business alumni